is an indoor sporting arena located in Izumo, Shimane, Japan.

Indoor arenas in Japan
Baseball venues in Japan
Covered stadiums in Japan
Sports venues in Shimane Prefecture
Sports venues completed in 1992
1992 establishments in Japan